P. crispa may refer to:
 Peperomia crispa, a plant species endemic to Ecuador
 Philobrya crispa, a bivalve species in the genus Philobrya
 Pimoa crispa, a spider species in the genus Pimoa
 Prasiola crispa, an alga species in the genus Prasiola

See also
 Crispa (disambiguation)